Redheads Preferred is a 1926 American silent comedy film directed by Allen Dale and starring Raymond Hitchcock, Marjorie Daw and Theodore von Eltz. It was produced by the independent studio Tiffany Pictures. The film's sets were designed by the art director Edwin B. Willis.

Synopsis
In order to secure a business contract, loyal husband John Morgan drinks heavily and agrees to accompany a mysterious read-headed woman to a dance. Discover what is going on his wife dresses up in a red wig and turns up as his escort for the night. At first very jealous, after a series of misunderstandings she comes to understand her husband's intentions and helps his secure the contract while keeping her identity secret.

Cast
 Raymond Hitchcock as Henry Carter
 Marjorie Daw as Angela Morgan
 Theodore von Eltz as John Morgan
 Cissy Fitzgerald as 	Mrs. Henry Carter
 Vivien Oakland as 	Mrs. Bill Williams 
 Charles A. Post as 	Bill Williams
 Leon Holmes as Office Boy
 Geraldine Leslie as 	Miss Crisp

References

Bibliography
 Munden, Kenneth White. The American Film Institute Catalog of Motion Pictures Produced in the United States, Part 1. University of California Press, 1997.
 Slide, Anthony. The Encyclopedia of Vaudeville. University Press of Mississippi, 2012.

External links
 

1926 films
1926 comedy films
1920s English-language films
American silent feature films
Silent American comedy films
American black-and-white films
Tiffany Pictures films
1920s American films